In Greek mythology, the name Budeia or Budea  (Ancient Greek: Βούδεια Boúdeia, "oxen-yoker") may refer to:

Budeia, a surname of Athena in Thessaly.
Budeia, daughter of Lycus. She was the wife of the Orchomenian king, Clymenus and mother of his children, including Erginus, Stration, Arrhon, Pyleus, Azeus, Eurydice and Axia. The Boeotian town of Budeion was named after her or alternatively attributed it to the Argive hero Budeion. An alternate spelling of her name is Buzyge (Βουζύγη Bouzyge same meaning as Boudeia)

Notes

References 

Homer, The Odyssey with an English Translation by A.T. Murray, PH.D. in two volumes. Cambridge, MA., Harvard University Press; London, William Heinemann, Ltd. 1919. . Online version at the Perseus Digital Library. Greek text available from the same website.
Pausanias, Description of Greece with an English Translation by W.H.S. Jones, Litt.D., and H.A. Ormerod, M.A., in 4 Volumes. Cambridge, MA, Harvard University Press; London, William Heinemann Ltd. 1918. . Online version at the Perseus Digital Library
Pausanias, Graeciae Descriptio. 3 vols. Leipzig, Teubner. 1903.  Greek text available at the Perseus Digital Library.
Stephanus of Byzantium, Stephani Byzantii Ethnicorum quae supersunt, edited by August Meineike (1790-1870), published 1849. A few entries from this important ancient handbook of place names have been translated by Brady Kiesling. Online version at the Topos Text Project.

Further reading 
Smith, William (ed.) Dictionary of Greek and Roman Biography and Mythology
Trümpy, Catherine (1994) 'Athena Boudeia', Z. Papyrologie Epigraphik 100, 407-412.

Epithets of Athena
Princesses in Greek mythology
Queens in Greek mythology